The 2006–07 Nemzeti Bajnokság II was Hungary's 56th season of the Nemzeti Bajnokság II, the second tier of the Hungarian football league system.

League table

Western group

Eastern group

See also
 2006–07 Magyar Kupa
 2006–07 Nemzeti Bajnokság I
 2006–07 Nemzeti Bajnokság III

References

External links
  
  

Nemzeti Bajnokság II seasons
2006–07 in Hungarian football
Hun